Star Dance may refer to:

 Stars Dance, debut album by Selena Gomez
 StarDance, a 2005 Philippine reality competition dance series
 StarDance (Czech TV series), a Czech reality competition dance series based on Dancing with the Stars that has aired since 2006
 Star Dancer, first novel in the Star Dancer tetralogy, written by the British author Beth Webb
 Star-Dancer, a Marvel Comics character

See also 
 Dance Star, 2010 British dance musical film